The Little Queen is a Canadian sports drama film, directed by Alexis Durand-Brault and released in 2014. Based on the true story of cyclist Geneviève Jeanson, whose career as a professional cyclist was derailed by a doping scandal, the film stars Laurence Leboeuf as Julie Arseneau, a cyclist who is caught doping just a few races short of the championship race, and Patrice Robitaille as her coach.

The film premiered theatrically in June 2014.

The film received four Prix Jutra nominations at the 17th Jutra Awards, for Best Actor (Robitaille), Best Actress (Leboeuf), Best Sound (Mario Auclair, Stéphane Bergeron, Marcel Pothier and Christian Rivest) and Best Editing (Louis-Philippe Rathé).

References

External links

2014 films
Canadian biographical drama films
Canadian sports drama films
2010s sports drama films
Films directed by Alexis Durand-Brault
2014 drama films
French-language Canadian films
2010s Canadian films